"Chasing It" is the 81st episode of the HBO television series The Sopranos,  the fourth episode of the second half of the show's sixth season, and the 16th episode of the season overall. Written by executive producer Matthew Weiner and directed by Tim Van Patten, it originally aired on April 29, 2007, and was watched by 6.76 million viewers upon its premiere.

Starring
 James Gandolfini as Tony Soprano
 Lorraine Bracco as Dr. Jennifer Melfi
 Edie Falco as Carmela Soprano
 Michael Imperioli as Christopher Moltisanti
 Dominic Chianese as Corrado Soprano, Jr. *
 Steven Van Zandt as Silvio Dante
 Tony Sirico as Paulie Gualtieri
 Robert Iler as Anthony Soprano, Jr.
 Jamie-Lynn Sigler as Meadow Soprano
 Aida Turturro as Janice Soprano Baccalieri *
 Steven R. Schirripa as Bobby Baccalieri
 Frank Vincent as Phil Leotardo
 Dan Grimaldi as Patsy Parisi
 Max Casella as Benny Fazio

* = credit only

Guest starring
 Jerry Adler as Hesh Rabkin

Also guest starring

Synopsis
Tony's losing streak in sports betting continues. When Hesh asks him about repayment of the $200,000 bridge loan, Tony pretends to have forgotten it and offers to pay the vig. Hesh was not charging interest and is insulted that Tony treats the loan as a mere business transaction. Tony calls Hesh a “shylock” in front of his crew. Later, Hesh says to his son-in-law, "At what point is it cheaper for him to settle it another way?"

Carmela sells the spec house with its sub-standard materials to her cousin Brian Cammarata and his pregnant wife. She tells Tony that she has cleared $600,000 and he assumes that half the profit is his. Tony wants to bet it on a "sure thing" but Carmela refuses and he yields to her. The "sure thing" wins but he only had $10,000 to bet on it. This leads to a furious argument with Carmela about money; he manhandles her and she throws her Lladró figurine at him, breaking it. Later, he apologizes and they reconcile. She is worried about the many threats hanging over them. He says he survived being shot; "Big picture-wise, I'm up, way up."

Vito's widow, Marie, asks Tony to help her son, Vito Jr., who has been wearing Goth makeup and misbehaving since his father's murder. Marie requests $100,000 to move her family to Maine to start over. Tony is reluctant. Both he and Phil (Marie's second cousin) talk to the boy, without effect. When Vito Jr. is expelled for defecating in the school shower, Tony decides to pay for the relocation. However, he gambles away the $100,000 he had reserved for it. Instead, he offers Marie to send Vito Jr. to a boot camp program in Idaho. He plays down her worries about corporal punishment and says he will pay the $18,000 fee. Marie reluctantly accepts and Vito Jr. is taken away against his will by the boot camp's staff, leaving his mother and sister in tears.

Driving by, Tony happens to notice Ahmed and Muhammad mingling with traditionally dressed Middle-Easterners on a street.

A.J. proposes to Blanca, who accepts after some hesitation, but later breaks up with him.

Renata, Hesh's girlfriend, dies suddenly. He is grief-stricken. Tony visits him and speaks clichéd words of condolence. He puts down a large paper bag: "I brought your money."

First appearance
 Jason Gervasi: Son of DiMeo capo Carlo Gervasi. He is seen greeting his father getting out of a car.
 Anthony Maffei: Soldier in Bobby's crew. He is seen at the casino and the pork store.

Deceased
 Renata, girlfriend of Hesh Rabkin. Dies  of a stroke.

Final appearances
"Chasing It" marks the final appearances in the series of these longtime recurring characters:
 Hesh Rabkin: Close associate of the Soprano/DiMeo crime family ever since the times of "Johnny Boy" Soprano.
 Hugh De Angelis and Mary De Angelis: The parents of Carmela Soprano.

Title reference
 The title refers to Tony's gambling addiction. "Chasing the vig" is common parlance in gambling vernacular for when one loses a bet(s) and then makes further wagers in order to either make up for the losses and/or keep up with any loan interest (the vig) accrued.
 It could also refer to Hesh having to actively look for Tony's debt money.
 It could also refer to the tendency of Tony to chase the thrill of winning in dangerous activities, as hypothesized by Dr. Melfi.
 It could also refer to AJ's pursuit of Blanca.

Production
 Max Casella (Benny Fazio) is promoted to the main cast of the series and billed in the opening credits but only for this episode.
 The character of Vito Spatafore Jr. was recast for this episode with Brandon Hannan replacing Frank Borrelli.
 John Cenatiempo, a stuntman on The Sopranos since its first season, joins the ranks of the show's actors as well, appearing as a mostly background Soprano crime family mobster character Anthony Maffei, beginning with this episode.
 This episode is unique in that it almost throughout its entirety employs the shaky camera style, with the exception of Dr. Melfi's scenes and scenes in Tony's car. The style may represent the episode's theme of Tony's feverish gambling and losing spree.
 The casino scenes were filmed at Atlantic City's Borgata Hotel and Casino.
 The headstone that Vito Jr. knocks over in the cemetery is for "David M. Hackel". Episode writer Matthew Weiner worked for David Hackel as a writer for the sitcom Becker.
 The harmonica player in Sinatra's band is Southside Johnny Lyon, an underground legend of New Jersey's music scene. He has worked extensively with Little Steven Van Zandt, who portrays the character of Silvio Dante. Van Zandt has written, produced and performed on four of Lyon's albums and was a founding member of his band, the Asbury Jukes, before leaving to join Bruce Springsteen's E Street Band. Both Springsteen and Van Zandt appear on the Asbury Jukes' Better Days album, on the song "It's Been a Long Time".
 The Tampa Bay-Buffalo football game being watched at the Bing that Tony loses money on is actually footage from the film The Replacements.

Connections to prior episodes
 While Tony lectures Vito Jr., he tells him he "goes about in pity for himself", which was the phrase he became intrigued with while in the hospital, and the same thing he said to Artie Bucco in the Season 6, Part I episode "Luxury Lounge."
 "Johnny Boy" Soprano once, after he cut off Satriale's (who owed him money) finger, told Tony to never ever gamble for the debts could get a man into serious trouble. (A flashback in the Season 3 episode "Fortunate Son")
 Tony brings up to Carmela that she stole money from his bird feed stashes, which happened in the Season 4 episode "Mergers and Acquisitions."
 Tony also reminds her about his leaning on her spec house building inspector ("Kaisha").
 The ornament that Carmela throws at Tony and smashes against the wall is the Lladró figurine that she tells A.J. and his girlfriend is worth $3,000 in the Season 4 episode "Everybody Hurts".
 Tony tries to give Hesh a cap from Cleaver, which was Christopher's movie from "Stage 5".

Other cultural and historical references
 Silvio Dante is seen reading a newspaper with an advertisement for Filene's Basement.
 The horse race Tony lost big on in Atlantic City was portrayed as being simulcast from Batavia Downs.
 Phil tells Nancy Sinatra that he attended Jerry Lewis's 1976 telethon where her father, Frank Sinatra, arranged for the reunion of the comedy duo Martin and Lewis.
 Christopher says Vito Jr. is probably planning another Columbine.
 When Tony and Bobby drop by to take him for a ride, Hesh lies and tells Tony he was watching a piece on the Hezbollah on CNN.
 The Twilight Zone episode that Carlo attempts to explain to Tony is titled "A Nice Place to Visit." In that episode, a dead gangster, Rocky Valentine, finds himself unable to lose when gambling and able to have any woman or any other pleasure he desires.
 Tony loses an NBA wager when Jerry Stackhouse hits a buzzer beater.
 When Tony switches channels from the basketball game he was betting on as Carmela comes into the bedroom, the TV station shows a clip of then-president George W. Bush meeting the visiting Abdullah bin Abdulaziz then-Saudi king.

Music 
 Nancy Sinatra sings "Bossman", a track off her 2004 album Nancy Sinatra, to a gathering of the New York and New Jersey families celebrating Phil Leotardo becoming boss.
 The song played in the Bada Bing! when the football game is on TV is "Kernkraft 400" by Zombie Nation.
 The guitar instrumental "Cavatina" is playing in the restaurant when A.J. proposes to Blanca.
 The music A.J. listens to in his car, while driving to the Puerto Rican parade day, is "Rompe" by Daddy Yankee. 
 The music heard in the background when Blanca breaks up with A.J. is an instrumental version of Ricky Martin's "Livin' La Vida Loca".
 Song playing when Tony is driving in the Escalade is Bill Doggett's "Honky Tonk."
 When Tony is in the back room of the Bing, talking to Silvio about Vito, Jr., "The Peppermint Twist" (1961) is playing. It is by Joey Dee & The Starlighters (from New Jersey).
 The song played during the casino scene and over the end credits is "Goin' Down Slow" by  Howlin' Wolf.

References

External links
"Chasing It"  at HBO

2007 American television episodes
The Sopranos (season 6) episodes
Television episodes directed by Tim Van Patten